Dick Sigmond (22 May 1897 – 22 February 1950) was a Dutch footballer. He competed in the men's tournament at the 1924 Summer Olympics.

References

External links

1897 births
1950 deaths
Dutch footballers
Netherlands international footballers
Olympic footballers of the Netherlands
Footballers at the 1924 Summer Olympics
Footballers from Dordrecht
Association football forwards
FC Dordrecht players
HFC Haarlem players